Year 438 (CDXXXVIII) was a common year starting on Saturday (link will display the full calendar) of the Julian calendar. At the time, it was known as the Year of the Consulship of Theodosius and Glabrio (or, less frequently, year 1191 Ab urbe condita). The denomination 438 for this year has been used since the early medieval period, when the Anno Domini calendar era became the prevalent method in Europe for naming years.

Events 
 By place 

 Byzantium 
 Emperor Theodosius II forbids the divulging of secrets of naval carpentry, probably to avoid its spread to the rising Vandal power in North Africa.
 February 15 – The Codex Theodosianus, a collection of edicts of Roman law, is published.
 Aelia Eudocia, wife of Theodosius II, goes on a pilgrimage to Jerusalem, bringing back with her holy relics to prove her faith.

 Europe 
 The last gladiatorial fights are held in the Colosseum in Rome.
 King Hermeric of the Suebic Kingdom of Galicia is forced to retire after a seven-year illness. He hands the government over to his son Rechila.

 Persia 
 Bahram V dies after an 18-year reign. He is succeeded by his son Yazdegerd II, who becomes the fifteenth Sassanid king of the Persian Empire.

 By topic 

 Religion 
 Relics of John Chrysostom are transported to Constantinople.

Births 
 Basina, queen of Thuringia (approximate date) 
 Epiphanius, bishop of Pavia (d. 496)

Deaths 
 Bahram V, king of the Persian Empire
 Feng Hong, last emperor of Northern Yan

References